Ponerorchis keiskei (synonym Amitostigma keiskei) is a species of plant in the family Orchidaceae. The species is endemic to Japan.

Taxonomy
The species was first described in 1879 by Karl Maximovich, using the name "Gymnadenia keiskei". However, this name had already been published in 1878 for a different orchid species, so Maximovich's name was illegitimate. In 1900, Achille Eugène Finet reduced the species to a variety as Gymnadenia gracilis var. keiskei – this was the first legitimate name. In 1919, Friedrich Rudolf Schlechter transferred the species to Amitostigma as Amitostigma keiskei. A molecular phylogenetic study in 2014 included Amitostigma keiskei and found that species of Amitostigma, Neottianthe and Ponerorchis were mixed together in a single clade, making none of the three genera monophyletic as then circumscribed. Amitostigma and Neottianthe were subsumed into Ponerorchis, with this species becoming Ponerorchis keiskei.

References

External links 
 
Biglobe, イワチドリ, 岩千鳥 , オオイワチドリ, 大岩千鳥 Amitostigma keiskei
Hardy Terrestrial Orchids, Brooklyn Botanical Garden, Amitostigma keiskei
Centro Bonsai Tenerife, Amitostigma keiskei (iwa-chidori) 

keiskei
Orchids of Japan
Plants described in 1900